Iphimedia is a genus of amphipods which belongs to the family Iphimediidae in the arthropod group Amphipoda. It is the only genus of the family to have species which live in tropical waters. All other genera of the family are only found in cold or deep oceans.

Species
Species in the genus Iphimedia include:

Iphimedia capicola K. H. Barnard, 1932
Iphimedia discreta Stebbing, 1910
Iphimedia eblanae Bate, 1857
Iphimedia gibba K. H. Barnard, 1940
Iphimedia gladiolus K. H. Barnard 1937
Iphimedia haurakiensis
Iphimedia hedgpethi (J. L. Barnard, 1969)
Iphimedia minuta G. O. Sars, 1882
Iphimedia nexa Myers and McGrath, 1987
Iphimedia obesa Rathke, 1843
Iphimedia orchestimana Ruffo, 1959
Iphimedia perplexa Myers and Costello, 1987
Iphimedia rickettsi (Shoemaker, 1931)
Iphimedia spatula Myers and McGrath, 1987
Iphimedia warraina Thomas and Barnard, 1991
Iphimedia xesta Thomas and Barnard, 1991
Iphimedia zora Thomas and J. L. Barnard, 1991

References

Gammaridea
Malacostraca genera